Camilo Elías Rencoret Lecaros (born 4 January 1991) is a Chilean professional footballer who plays for Barnechea of the Primera B de Chile.

References
 
 

1991 births
Living people
Chilean footballers
Everton de Viña del Mar footballers
A.C. Barnechea footballers
Primera B de Chile players
Chilean Primera División players
Association football defenders